Theresa A. Yugar is a Latina feminist liberation theologian, notable for her work on the 17th century nun, Sor Juana Inés de la Cruz.

Organisational affiliations
She served as co-chair of the American Academy of Religion and Society of Biblical Literature's Women's Caucus from 2013 - 2015 and as a board member on the Women's Ordination Conference from 2006-2009.

Education and career
Yugar earned a Master of Divinity from Harvard Divinity School in 1997, and later completed a PhD from Claremont Graduate University in 2013. Her areas of expertise include Ecofeminist Theory and Praxis and Gender in Colonial Latin American History. She is the recipient of a Fulbright and Hispanic Theological Initiative Fellowship, and Scholar for the Chancellor’s Doctoral Incentive Program.
Yugar teaches in the Chicana(o) and Latina(o) Studies and the Women’s, Gender, and Sexuality Studies departments at California State University in Los Angeles, California.

Published work
Her published work includes Sor Juana Inés de la Cruz: Feminist Reconstruction of Biography and Text where she identifies de la Cruz's life and work as a precursor to current ecofeminist theologies.  This book is the basis for her 2019 Ted-Ed Animation entitled History’s Worst Nun documenting the details of 17th century Mexican poet and scholar Sor Juana Inés de la Cruz.  This Ted-Ed Animation was the second most viewed Ted-Ed Animation in 2019 with nearly 6.5 million views.  As well, she is co-editor of Valuing Lives, Healing Earth: Religion, Gender, and Life on Earth (2021). This book honors and builds on the work of Rosemary Radford Ruether, a major Christian, feminist theologian. It addresses the connections between gender, ecology, colonialism and indigenous issues in a global Christian context.

References 

Year of birth missing (living people)
Living people
Claremont Graduate University alumni
Harvard Divinity School alumni